North Branch Moose River starts at Big Moose Lake and flows into Middle Branch Moose River in Old Forge, New York.

References 

Rivers of New York (state)
Rivers of Herkimer County, New York